Vasily Mikhailovich Peskov (14 March 1930 – 12 August 2013) was a Russian writer, journalist, photographer, traveller and ecologist. He worked in the Russian tabloid newspaper Komsomolskaya Pravda since 1956. From 1975 until 1990, he conducted the TV programme In the World of Animals on Soviet TV.

In 1964, he was awarded a Lenin Prize. In 1990, he was among the winners of UNEP's Global 500 Roll of Honour.  In 2013, the Voronezh Nature Reserve, one of the oldest reserves in Russia, was officially renamed in his honor.

Books 
Steps on Dew (1963)
White Dreams (1965)
End of the World (1967)
The Roads of America (1973, with B. Strelnikov)
War and People (1979)
Lost in the Taiga: One Russian Family's Fifty-Year Struggle for Survival and Religious Freedom in the Siberian Wilderness (1990) about the Lykov family
Alaska is Greater than You Think (1995)
Wanderings (1999)
Proselki (2000)

References

External links
 Yankee In Kamchatka, with Robert Perkins and Vasily Peskov (in English)
 Russian literature of 20th century. Nikolai Skatov (ed.) Vol. 3. Olma-Press, Moscow, 2005.
 Заглядывающий в природу 
 Adult Award Winner in 1990
 Vasily Peskov // mosdepkultura

1930 births
2013 deaths
People from Novousmansky District
Russian journalists
Russian writers
Soviet writers
Soviet television presenters
Soviet journalists
Recipients of the Order "For Merit to the Fatherland", 4th class
Russian columnists
Lenin Prize winners